A cavern is another name for a cave or a large room within a cave.

Cavern or The Cavern may also refer to:
The Cavern Club or The Cavern, a rock-and-roll club in Liverpool, England
The Cavern (2005 film), a 2005 horror film
The Cavern (1964 film), directed by Edgar G. Ulmer
Caverns (novel), a 1989 novel written collaboratively as an experiment by Ken Kesey
"Cavern" (song), a song by Phish
"Cavern", a song from Liquid Liquid's 1983 EP Optimo